The House of Clocks is an Italian horror film directed by Lucio Fulci.

Plot
A wealthy older couple is murdered during a robbery by three young perpetrators. The event results in a supernatural reversal of time, symbolized by the fast, counter-clockwise movement of hands on the house's many clocks. Eventually, this leads to the resurrection of the older couple, who subsequently seek to terrorize the three burglars.

An elderly couple, Vittorio and Sara Corsini, live in a rambling country house filled with clocks of all shapes and sizes. The couple's taciturn groundsman Peter is happy enough looking after the slavering pack of dogs the couple owns. But the maid Maria is becoming more and more suspicious of her sinister employers that they are hiding something. Sure enough, she discovers the dead bodies of a money-grabbing nephew and his wife lying preserved in open coffins in the wine cellar. Maria is gorily killed by the elderly Sara in the greenhouse the next morning while announcing her plans to quit.

Meanwhile, three hoodlums, Diana, Tony and Paul are driving through the area and decide to rob the old couple's house after receiving a tip-off from a grocery store owner in a nearby town about the wealth it supposedly contains and the decrepitude of the owners. That evening, Diana cunningly talks her way into the household by pretending that her car has broken down nearby and asks to use the phone. Soon, the phone lines are cut by her male accomplices, and they force entry through an open window. Their plans to rob the old couple go badly wrong when Peter intervenes with his shotgun. A bloodbath ensues with Sara accidentally getting shot, Peter getting killed by Paul, and Vittorio attacks Tony, forcing Diana to shoot him dead. The young trio are horrified by this turn of events but decide to bundle the bodies away in a cupboard.

Initially, the dazed criminals fail to notice what effect the mayhem has had on all the clocks in the house. Each clock stops at 8:00 PM, the exact time the couple were killed. When they do notice, they try to leave, but are trapped indoors by the Doberman Pinschers let loose to prowl the grounds. Stranger still, the clocks begin to move in reverse, first slowly, then faster. The three decide to relax in the house overnight, and they head off upstairs to smoke some joints. Diana and Tony get a little too drawn into it and start to make out and soon begin to have sex.

Paul, left out of the lovemaking, wanders dejectedly downstairs. He discovers the bloodstains on the dining room floor where the killings took place have disappeared, and then he sees the bodies lying back where they'd fallen. Before he can alert the others, Paul is shot by an unseen figure stalking the house. Hearing the gunshot, Diana and Tony quickly dress and rush downstairs and see the old couple reanimate and advance towards them. In the kitchen, Diana is trapped by the old woman who grabs a knife and stabs her through the hand, pinning her to the kitchen table. Sara then retrieves a ring that Diana had stolen from her ring finger. Making a narrow escape, Diana and Tony find a severely wounded Paul in the cellar. (Note: illogical time distortions continue as Diana's hand heals up while Paul's injuries remain.) Diana and Tony escape from the cellar through a high window and emerge into the grounds. Paul is too injured to hoist himself up to the window and is axed to death by the vengefully reanimated Peter. As the couple run across the grounds, now in daylight with the clocks in full reverse, Tony is pulled into a shallow grave by the corpse of Maria, the maid. She kills him with a wooden stick through his stomach before heading off to confront the old couple. Maria confronts the elderly couple in the wine cellar with murdering their nephew and his wife to remove them as their rightful heirs to the estate. Then, the niece and nephew finally revive and the old couple are killed again by their previous victims. Diana staggers away from the house.

Suddenly, Diana, Tony, and Paul awaken outside the country house in their car. Apparently all that happened to them was just a dream brought on with special intensity by the marijuana they've been smoking. Inside the house, the fully alive nephew and niece enjoy being alive again and are having their morning breakfast, with Maria the maid attending to them. The dead bodies of Vittorio and Sara are in the wine cellar, having been substituted for them.

Driving away from the house, Diana, Tony, and Paul remark on the astonishing similarities of their dreams of being at the house and time moving backward. A dead cat they picked up on the road earlier suddenly revives and attacks them, forcing Tony to crash their car off a cliff and killing them all again. Inexplicably, the car's clock and all the wristwatches on the bloodied and dead Diana, Tony, and Paul stop and begin to roll backward.

Cast

 Keith Van Hoven as Tony
 Karina Huff as Sandra
 Paolo Paoloni as Vittorio Corsini
 Bettine Milne as Sara Corsini
 Peter Hintz as Paul
 Carla Cassola as Maria
 Al Cliver as Peter
 Paolo Bernardi as The Nephew
 Francesca DeRose as The Niece
 Massimo Sarchielli as Storekeeper

Production 
The House of Clocks is one of four films made for the Italian television series La case maledette. The series was developed by Luciano Martino following the release of Brivido Giallo. The series was intended to be part of six films to be directed by Fulci, Umberto Lenzi and Lamberto Bava. Due to other commitments, Bava stepped out of the project to be replaced by Marcello Avallone, who also dropped out of the project leading to only four films being made. For his two films, Fulci asked to replace the two stories he was given with two of his own design. The films were shot on 16mm outside of Rome on a schedule of four weeks each. The House of Clocks was filmed in a villa in Torgiano between January 31 and February 25, 1989.

Release
Along with the other films made for  La case maledette, The House of Clocks was shelved. When asked about the films being released in the early 1990s, Fulci responded that the series had been sold to elsewhere in the world, they would have to ask Reiteitalia when they would be shown in Italy. The films were only shown in 2000 in Italy when they were released on VHS thanks to the efforts of the magazine Nocturno Cinema. They were shown on Italian satellite television in 2006. The film was released on DVD in the United States by Shriek Show on November 19, 2002.

Fulci spoke very positively on his two films made for La case maledette, calling them "Fantastic! Excellent Filmmaking!" and that they were "Two of his best films [he'd] made!".

Critical response 
Robert Firsching of AllMovie called the film "a credible addition to the director's oeuvre – sometimes reminiscent of Dolls or Pete Walker's creepy punishment gothics (Frightmare, House of Whipcord, etc.) – and fans should give it a look".

Footnotes

Sources

External links

Films directed by Lucio Fulci
Italian supernatural horror films
Italian zombie films
Italian television films
Horror television films
Films shot in Italy